He Is Never Coming Back is the second studio album by American hardcore band Gaza. The album was originally released on November 10, 2009 through Black Market Activities. A vinyl version of the album was released on October 25, 2012. It is Gaza's last album with guitarist Luke Sorenson, and the first release by the band with bassist Anthony Lucero.

Track listing

Note: The iTunes store lists the title of track 14 as simply "(no title)".

Personnel
Gaza
 Jon Parkin – vocals
 Michael Mason – guitar
 Luke Sorenson – guitar
 Anthony "Tino" Lucero – bass
 Casey Hansen – drums

Production
 Andrew "Andy" Patterson – engineering and mixing
 Gaza – mixing
 Nick Zampiello – mastering
 Joshn Wingar – layout design and artwork

References

2009 albums
Black Market Activities albums
Gaza (band) albums